Holzhauer is a German-language surname, meaning "woodsman" or "lumberjack". Notable people with the surname include:

 James Holzhauer (born 1984), American game show contestant and professional sports gambler.
  (1887–1986), German artist
 Fritz Holzhäuer (1902–1982), German general in the Wehrmacht during World War II

German-language surnames